Benwell is a surname, and may refer to:

John Hodges Benwell (1764–1785), English genre painter
Joseph Austin Benwell (1816–1886), English artist, engraver and illustrator
Mary Benwell (1739–after 1800), English artist
Thomas Benwell, Master of University College, Oxford
Joseph Benwell Clark (1857–1938), English artist